The Earth Pressed Flat is the seventh album by 10,000 Maniacs, released in 1999. The album contains nine songs that had been written for, but not used in, the band's previous album, Love Among the Ruins: "The Earth Pressed Flat", "Once a City", "On & On (Mersey Song)", "Somebody's Heaven", "Cabaret", "Beyond the Blue", "Smallest Step", "Time Turns" and "Hidden in My Heart". "Beyond the Blue" and "Time Turns" had been released on the single "More Than This", but were re-recorded for this album.

All tracks are credited to 10,000 Maniacs as a band for royalty purposes, though the lyricists of the songs received additional credit. Dennis Drew wrote "Ellen", "Glow", "Smallest Step" and "Rainbows". John Lombardo wrote "The Earth Pressed Flat", "Once a City", "On & On (Mersey Song)", "Beyond the Blue" and "Time Turns". Lombardo and Drew shared writing credit on "Hidden in My Heart". Lombardo, Mary Ramsey and Rob Buck shared writing credit on "Somebody's Heaven".

Track listing
"The Earth Pressed Flat" – 4:11
"Ellen" – 3:27
"Once a City" – 4:22
"Glow" – 2:31
"On & On (Mersey Song)" – 3:32
"Somebody's Heaven" – 4:41
"Cabaret" – 3:02
"Beyond the Blue" – 3:17
"Smallest Step" – 3:32
"In the Quiet Morning" – 2:53
"Time Turns" – 3:49
"Hidden in My Heart" – 4:18
"Who Knows Where the Time Goes" – 6:40
"Rainbows" – 5:16 (hidden track, US release)

Personnel
10,000 Maniacs
Jerome Augustyniak – percussion, drums, vocals
Robert Buck – guitar
Dennis Drew – synthesizer, piano, keyboards, Hammond organ, pump organ
Steve Gustafson – bass guitar
John Lombardo – acoustic and electric guitar, package concept
Mary Ramsey – violin, viola, vocals

Technical staff
John Caruso – engineer
Armand John Petri – producer, engineer
Blair Woods – coordination, 
John Lombardo – graphic design, album artwork
Nick Balgona – mastering

References
Liner notes from 10,000 Maniacs album: The Earth Pressed Flat.

10,000 Maniacs albums
1999 albums
Bar/None Records albums